Sindhu Bhairavi may refer to:

 Sindhu Bhairavi (raga)
 Sindhu Bhairavi (film), 1985 Indian Tamil language drama film 
 Sindhu Bhairavi (TV series), Tamil serial and a soap opera that premiered in 2010